The Bear River is a  tributary of the Androscoggin River in the U.S. state of Maine.  It rises in Grafton Notch at the northeastern end of the Mahoosuc Range and flows southeast, joining the Androscoggin in the town of Newry.  Maine Route 26 follows the entire course of the river.

See also
List of rivers of Maine

References

Maine Streamflow Data from the USGS
Maine Watershed Data From Environmental Protection Agency

Tributaries of the Kennebec River
Rivers of Oxford County, Maine
Rivers of Maine